The highest award which is presented by the Max Planck Society for services to society is the Harnack Medal, first awarded in 1925. The Harnack Medal is named after the theologian Adolf von Harnack, who was the first president of the Kaiser Wilhelm Society, the predecessor organization of the MPG, from 1911 to 1930. The medal has only been awarded 33 times since 1924, including 10 times by the Kaiser Wilhelm Society (1924–1936) and 23 times by the Max Planck Society (1953–2017). 

Past recipients of the Harnack Medal are:

Angela Merkel 2021
Peter Gruss 2017
Hermann Neuhaus 2008
Lu Yongxiang 2006
Hubert Markl 2004
Haim Harari 2001
Hans F. Zacher 1998
Michael Sela 1996
Heinz A. Staab 1996
Reimar Lüst 1993
Richard von Weizsäcker 1990
Hans Merkle 1984
Kurt Birrenbach 1981
Walther Gerlach 1974
Adolf Butenandt 1973
Carl Wurster 1970
Alfred Kühn 1965
Heinrich Lübke 1964
Otto Heinrich Warburg 1963
Georg Schreiber 1962
Erich Kaufmann 1960
Theodor Heuss 1959
Otto Hahn 1954 (in Gold 1959)
Gustav Winkler 1953
Ludwig Prandtl 1936
Albert Vögler 1936
Carl Duisberg 1934
Max Planck 1933
Gustav Krupp von Bohlen und Halbach 1933
Franz von Mendelssohn 1932
Carl Correns 1932
Friedrich Schmidt-Ott 1929
Fritz Haber 1926
Adolf von Harnack 1925

References

External links
 

Science and technology awards
Max Planck Society